Other Voices Records is a Russian-based independent record label. Its main focus is electronic music. The label was founded in 2007.

Artists 
 A New Life
 Aerial FX
 ADN' Ckrystall
 Angie Damage
 Attrition
 Tobias Bernstrup
 Eleven Pond
 Forthcoming Fire
 Gifts In Secret
 Indians In Moscow
 Individual Industry
 The Last Hour
 Neon
 New Politicians
 Nouvelle Phénomène
 m-fast
 Merzbow
 Parade Ground
 Pronoise
 Rise and Fall of a Decade
 Sensor
 Soft Riot
 Sonic Death
 Stress
 The Silicon Scientist
 Venus In Furs

Releases 
 Indians In Moscow – Indians In Moscow CD (2011)
 Attrition – The Truth In Dark Corners CD / DD / MC (2011)
 Gifts In Secret – Reaching CD (2011)
 Individual Industry – Twenty Years In One Hour CD / DD (2011)
 Forthcoming Fire – Set The World On Fire CD (2010)
 Aerial FX – Same River Twice CD / DD (2010)
 Neon - Memories CD / DD (2010) - 2nd edition
 Various - Other Voices CD (2010)
 Sensor - Naked CD / DD (2009)
 Sensor - Off-White Trash DD (2009)
 The Last Hour - The Last Hour CD / DD (2009)
 The Last Hour - The Last Hour EP DD (2009)
 Neon – Memories CD / DD (2008) - 1st edition
 Speaking Silence – Insides CD / DD (2008)
 Rise And Fall Of A Decade – Yesterday, Today & Tomorrow CD / DD (2007)
 Angie Damage – Nicotine Tongue EP CD / DD (2007)
 Eleven Pond - Bas-Relief CD (2011)
 Tobias Bernstrup - Sing My Body Electric LP / CD / MC (2012)
 Nouvelle Phénomène - Glory Of Romance LP / CD (2014)
 Soft Riot - Fiction Prediction LP / CD / MC (2013)
 A New Life - Fright †reasures MC (2013)
 Stress - The Big Wheel LP / CD (2013)
 Parade Ground - A Room With A View LP / CD / MC (2015)
 Parade Ground - Sanctuary MC (2016)
 Parade Ground - Cut Up CD (2016)
 New Politicians - Remission CD (2016)
 Pronoise - Low Light Vision CD (2016)
 Merzbow - Escape Mask LP / CD (2016)
 Sonic Death - Hate Machine LP / MC (2016)
 Anything Box - Hope LP (2016)
 Bill And Murray - A New Kind Of High LP / CD (2016)
 m-fast - Videoband MC (2016)

External links
 
 
 
 Other Voices Records' at SoundCloud.com
 Other Voices Records at Last.fm

Russian record labels
Companies based in Nizhny Novgorod